The Shirazi people, also known as Mbwera, are a Bantu ethnic group inhabiting the Swahili coast and the nearby Indian ocean islands. They are particularly concentrated on the islands of Zanzibar, Pemba and Comoros.

A number of Shirazi legends proliferated along the East African coast, most involving a named or unnamed Persian prince marrying a Swahili princess. Modern academics reject the authenticity of the primarily Persian origin claim. They point to the relative rarity of Persian customs and speech, lack of documentary evidence of Shia Islam in the Muslim literature on the Swahili Coast, and instead a historic abundance of Sunni Arab-related evidence. The documentary evidence, like the archaeological, "for early Persian settlement is likewise completely lacking.".

The Shirazi are notable for helping spread Islam on the Swahili Coast, their role in the establishment of the southern Swahili sultanates like Mozambique and Angoche, their influence in the development of the Swahili language, and their opulent wealth. The East African coastal area and the nearby islands served as their commercial base.

History

Mythic: Persians and Arabs
There are two main myths about the origins of the Shirazi people. One thesis based on oral tradition states that immigrants from the Shiraz region in southwestern Iran directly settled various mainland ports and islands on the eastern Africa seaboard beginning in the tenth century, in an area between Mogadishu, Somalia in the north and Sofala in the south. According to Irving Kaplan, prior to the 7th century, the coastal areas frequented by the Persian migrants were inhabited by "Bushmanoid" Africans. By the time of the Persian settlement in the area, these earlier occupants had been displaced by incoming Bantu and Nilotic populations. More people from different parts of the Persian Gulf also continued to migrate to the Swahili coast over several centuries thereafter, and these formed the modern Shirazi.

However, East African and other historians dispute this claim. According to Gideon S. Were and Derek A. Wilson, there were Bantu settlements along the East African coast by 500 AD, with some of the settlements taking the form of "highly organised kingdoms governed by ruling classes with well-established traditional religions".

The second theory on Shirazi origins posits that they came from Persia, but first settled on the Somalia littoral near Mogadishu. In the twelfth century, as the gold trade with the distant entrepot of Sofala on the Mozambique seaboard grew, the settlers are then said to moved southwards to various coastal towns in Kenya, Tanzania, northern Mozambique and the Indian Ocean islands. By 1200 AD, they had established local sultanates and mercantile networks on the islands of Kilwa, Mafia and Comoros along the Swahili coast, and in northwestern Madagascar.

Most contemporary academics reject the authenticity of the primarily Persian origin claim. They point to the relative rarity of Persian customs and speech, lack of documentary evidence of Shia Islam in the Muslim literature on the Swahili Coast, and instead a historic abundance of Sunni Arab-related evidence. The documentary evidence, like the archaeological, "for early Persian settlement is likewise completely lacking." There are also several different versions of stories about the settlement of Shirazi along the Swahili Coast. In his seminal 1983 article "The 'Shirazi' Problem in East African Coastal History," J. de V. Allen wrote that he hoped his work would "bury for once and for all the idea that East African Shirazis must be ultimately descended from immigrants from the Persian Gulf. It is clear that, even if there were such immigrants and some of them played an important role in the early days, the Shirazi phenomenon itself is a purely African one."

The Shirazi people have been linked to the Lamu Archipelago – islands in the Indian Ocean close to north Kenya, which oral traditions claim were settled by seven brothers from Shiraz in south Iran. The Lamu archipelago descendants then moved south in the 10th and 11th centuries. This is contested and the opposing view states that the Shirazi legend took on new importance in the 19th century, during the period of Omani domination. Claims of Persian Shirazi ancestry were used to distance locals from Arab newcomers. The emphasis that the Shirazi came very long ago and intermarried with indigenous locals is revisionist politics that attempts to fuse the Shirazi origins theory with Swahili heritage according to this view.

Bantu-speaking Africans
Dismissing the ancestral claims of the native people as fictions, some contemporary scholars assert that both the Swahili and Shirazi people are the descendants of Bantu-speaking farmers who migrated to the East African coast in the first millennium C.E. They adopted maritime tools and systems, including fishing and sailing, and developed a healthy regional trade network by the 8th century C.E. The upsurge in Indian Ocean trade after the 9th century C.E. brought an increase in Muslim traders and Islamic influence, and beginning in the 12th century, many elites converted. These elites constructed complex, often fictive, genealogies that connected them to the central Islamic lands. Since Persian traders were dominant in the early centuries of the second millennium, many Swahili patricians adopted Persian cultural motifs and claimed a distant common ancestry.

The Kilwa Chronicle, a medieval document written in Arabic and Portuguese versions, indicates that the early Shirazi also settled in Hanzuan (Anjouan in the Comoros Islands), the Green Island (Pemba), Mandakha, Shaugu and Yanbu. According to the anthropologist Helena Jerman, the Shirazi identity (Washirazi) was born after the arrival of Islam, in the 17th century. Their traditional Bantu lineage names were gradually abandoned and substituted with Arabic family names (e.g. Wapate became Batawiyna), new origin legends and social structures were imagined into folklores, and the societal structures were adopted from Persian and Arab settlers from nearby societies in Asia.

The Shirazi rulers established themselves on Mrima coast (Kenya) and the Sultan of Kilwa who identified himself as a Shirazi, overthrew the Omani governor in 1771. A French visitor to this Sultanate, named Morice estimated that about a tenth of the population was Swahili-speaking Arabs and Shirazi, a third were free Africans, and the remainder were African slaves.

Both Shirazi and non-Shirazi sultanates on the coast served as trade centers for ivory, ambergris, slaves, gold, and timber coming from the African interior, and textiles, ceramics, and silver from the Indian Ocean. These slaves were sourced from interior Africa, such as those around Malawi the Democratic Republic of Congo, and the Mozambique.

Islamic records
Arab geographers from the twelfth and later centuries historically divided the eastern coast of Africa into several regions based on each region's respective inhabitants. According to the twelfth century geography of Al-Idrisi, completed in 1154 CE, there were four littoral zones: Barbar (Bilad al Barbar; "land of the Berbers") in the Horn of Africa, which was inhabited by Somalis and stretched southward to the Shebelle river; Zanj (Ard al-Zanj; "country of the blacks"), located immediately below that up to around Tanga or the southern part of Pemba island; Sofala (Ard Sufala), extending from Pemba to an unknown terminus, but probably around the Limpopo river; and Waq-Waq, the shadowy land south thereof. However, earlier geographers make no mention of Sofala. The texts written after twelfth century also call the island of Madagascar al-Qumr, and include it as a part of Waq-Waq.

Islam was introduced to the northern Somalia coast early on from the Arabian peninsula, shortly after the hijra. Zeila's two-mihrab Masjid al-Qiblatayn dates to the 7th century, and is the oldest mosque in the city. In the late 9th century, Al-Yaqubi wrote that Muslims were already living along this northern littoral. He also mentioned that the Adal kingdom had its capital in the city. Ibn al-Mujawir later wrote that, due to various battles in the Arabian peninsula, Banu Majid people from Yemen settled in the central Mogadishu area. Yaqut and Ibn Said described the city as another important center of Islam, which actively traded with the Swahili-speaking African region to the south of it. The thirteenth century texts also mention mosques and individuals with names such as "al-Shirazi" and "al-Sirafi" and a clan called "Sirafi at Merca", suggestive of an early Persian presence in the area.

To the south of the Barbar region, Al-Masudi mentions seaborne trade from Oman and Siraf port near Shiraz to the African Zanj coast, Sofala and Waq-Waq. Ibn Battuta would later visit the Kilwa Sultanate in the 14th century, which was at the time ruled by a Yemeni dynasty led by Sultan Hasan bin Sulayman. Battuta described the majority of inhabitants as being "Zanj" and "jet-black" in color, many of whom had facial tattoos. The term "Zanj" was used to distinguish not between Africans and non-Africans, but between Muslims and non-Muslims. The former were part of the ulama while the latter were designated "Zanj." In Kilwa, then, Islam was still largely limited to the patrician elite. Battuta also described its ruler as often making slave and booty raids on the African idolators as he described the Zanj country. Of the loot, "a fifth was set aside for the family of the Prophet, and all distributed in the manner prescribed by the Koran". Despite these raids against the inland African populations, a symbiotic relationship also appears to have existed between the Africans and the coastal people.

Another set of records are found in the Book of the Zanj (Kitab al-Zanuj), a likely compilation of mythical oral traditions and memories of settled traders on the Swahili coast. The late 19th-century document claims that Persians and Arabs were sent by governors of the Persian Gulf region to conquer and colonize the trading coast of East Africa. It also mentions the establishment of the Shirazi dynasty by Madagan and Halawani Arab merchants, whose identity and roots are unclear. According to R. F. Morton, a critical assessment of the Book of the Zanj indicates that much of the document consists of deliberate falsifications by its author Fathili bin Omari, which were intended to invalidate the established oral traditions of local Bantu groups. The Kitab'''s ascription of Arabian origins for the founders of Malindi and other settlements on the Swahili coast is also contradicted by recorded 19th-century clan and town traditions, which instead emphasize that these early Shirazi settlers were of Persian ancestral heritage.

The vast majority of modern scholars agree that there is little to no evidence of substantive Asian migration to East Africa in the medieval period. Swahili elites, many of whom had extensive trade connections with Arabia, Persia, and India fashioned themselves as a quintessential Muslim aristocracy. This demanded fictive or real genealogies that linked them back to early Muslims in Arabia or Persia, something seen in many parts of the Islamic World. It was also common for Arab, Persian, and Indian traders to "winter" on the coast for up to six months as the monsoon winds shifted. They would often marry the daughters of Swahili traders, passing on their genealogy through Islam's patrilineal descent system. The archaeological record firmly refutes any supposition of mass migrations or colonization but evidences extensive trade relations with Persia. Trade links with the Persian Gulf were especially prominent from the 10th to 14th centuries, which prompted the development of local mythologies of Persian or Shirazi origin. According to Abdulaziz Lodhi, the Iranians and Arabs called the Swahili coast Zangistan or Zangibar, which literally means "the Black Coast", and the Muslim immigrants from South Asia (modern Pakistan and India) to southern Arabian lands such as Oman and Yemen identified themselves as a Shirazi. The Muslim Shirazi settlements on the Swahili coast maintained a close relationship with those on islands such as Comoros, through marriage and mercantile networks. According to Tor Sellström, the Comorian population profile has a large proportion of Arab and African heritage, particularly on Grande Comore and Anjouan and these were under Shirazi sultanates.

The contact of Shirazi people with colonial Europeans started with the arrival in Kilwa sultanate of Vasco da Gama, the Portuguese explorer, in 1498. A few years later, the Portuguese and Shirazi people entered into disputes regarding trading routes and rights particularly about gold, a conflict that destroyed both Kilwa and Mombasa port towns of Shirazi rulers. The Portuguese military power and direct trading with India in the beginning, followed by other European powers, led to a rapid decline of the Shirazi towns which thrived and depended primarily on the trade. In parallel to European competition, non-Swahili-speaking Bantu groups began attacking Shirazi towns in the sixteenth and seventeenth centuries. Thus, the Shirazi sultanates faced war from sea and land, leading to a rapid loss of power and trading facilities. The Omani Arabs re-asserted their military in the seventeenth century, and they defeated the Portuguese in 1698, at Mombasa. The Portuguese agreed to cede this part of Africa, and a fresh migration of Arabs from Oman and Yemen into the Shirazi people settlements followed.

Contemporary demography
Some towns and islands have had a much larger concentration of Shirazi people. For example, in 1948, about 56% of the Zanzibar population reported Shirazi ancestry of Persian origins. In local elections, the Shirazi voted for whichever party was politically expedient, whether the ethnic minority-supported Zanzibar Nationalist Party or the mainland Tanzania-associated Afro-Shirazi Party.

Genetic analysis by Msadie et al. (2010) indicates that the most common paternal lineages among the contemporary Comorian population, which includes Shirazi people, are clades that are frequent in sub-Saharan Africa (E1b1a1-M2 (41%) and E2-M90 (14%)). The samples also contain some northern Y chromosomes, indicating possible paternal ancestry from South Iran (E1b1b-V22, E1b1b-M123, F*(xF2, GHIJK), G2a, I, J1, J2, L1, Q1a3, R1*, R1a*, R1a1 and R2 (29.7%)), and Southeast Asia (O1 (6%)). The Comorians also predominantly bear mitochondrial haplogroups linked with sub-Saharan East African populations in East and South East Africa (L0, L1, L2 and L3′4(xMN) (84.7%)), with the remaining maternal clades associated with Southeast Asia (B4a1a1-PM, F3b and M7c1c (10.6%) and M(xD, E, M1, M2, M7) (4%)) but no Middle Eastern lineages. According to Msadie et al., given that there are no common Middle Eastern maternal haplogroups on the Comoros, there is "striking evidence for male-biased gene flow from the Middle East to the Comoros", which is "entirely consistent with male-dominated trade and religious proselytisation being the forces that drove the Middle Eastern gene flow to the Comoros".

Religion
Today, most Swahili follow the Shafi'i branch of Sunni Islam.

Language
Like most of the Swahili people, the Shirazi speak local dialects of the Swahili language as a mother tongue. It belongs to the Bantu branch of the Niger-Congo family. However, the dialects of Swahili language is best described as a syncretic language, that blended Sabaki Bantu, Comoro, Pokomo, Iranian, Arabic and Indian words and structure reflecting the syncretic fusion of people from diverse backgrounds that form the Shirazi people.

Comorian is divided into two language groups, a western group composed of Shingazidja and Shimwali, and an eastern group, composed of Shindzwani and Shimaore. Shingazidja is spoken on Ngazidja, and has around 312,000 total speakers. Shindzwani is spoken on Ndzwani, and has roughly 275,000 total speakers. Shimaore is spoken on Mayotte, and has an estimated 136,500 total speakers. Shimwali is spoken on Mwali, and has about 28,700 total speakers.

Speakers of the Comorian languages use the Arabic script as their writing system.

Society and culture
The Shirazi people have primarily been a mercantile community, thriving on trade. Initially, between the 10th and 12th centuries, it was the gold producing regions of Mozambique that brought them to the coast of Africa. Later the trading in African slaves, ivory, spices, silk and produce from clove, coconut and other plantations run with slave labor became the mainstay of the trading activity. These African slaves were captured during inland raids. Their presence in Swahili towns is mentioned in fourteenth and fifteenth century memoirs of Islamic travelers such as that of the fourteenth century explorer Ibn Battuta. The Shirazi were a large supplier of these slaves to the colonial era European plantations and various Sultanates. According to August Nimtz, after international slave trading was banned, the Shirazi community was economically crippled.

The arrival of Islam with the Persians and Arabs affected the Shirazi identity and social structures in many ways. According to Helena Jerman, the word "Sawahil" among the Shirazi people referred to "free but landless" strata of the society who had adopted Islam, then a new social category on the Swahili coast. Among the Muslims, this was the lowest social strata of free people, just above the slave strata. Along with the Wa-shirazi strata, there were other strata, such as the Wa-arabu, Wa-manga, Wa-shihiri, Wa-shemali, and the noble pure Arab ruler category called Wa-ungwana. The social strata of the Shirazi people came with its own strata taboos and privileges. For example, the upper strata Waungwana (also called Swahili-Arabs) had the exclusive right to build prestigious stone houses, and Waungwana men practiced polygynous hypergamy, that is father children with low status and slave women. The ritual and sexual purity of the Waungwana women were maintained by confining them to certain premises within these houses, called Ndani''.

According to Michel Ben Arrous and Lazare Ki-Zerbo, the Shirazi society has been "fractured by the caste implications of race and class". As the Arabs who arrived from Persia and Arabian lands became slave owners and traders, they considered their slaves as inferior and unfit for Islam. The slave girls were concubines, who bore them children. The male offspring were considered Muslims, but the female offspring inherited their slavery and their non-Muslim heritage. Even in post-colonial society, the residual dynamics and distinctions of a racial caste system have remained among some Shirazi people. According to the sociologist Jonas Ewald and other scholars, the social stratification is not limited in the Shirazi society to racial lines, but extends to economic status and the region of origin.

The Shirazi culture is Islamic in nature, identifying largely with its Persian and Arabic roots. There are also Bantu influences, such as the Swahili language.

According to G. Thomas Burgess, Ali Sultan Issa and Seif Sharif Hamad, many Africans "claimed Shirazi identity to obscure their slave ancestry, to mark their status as landowners, or to gain access to World War II rations distributed by the colonial state along ethnic lines." Shirazi consider themselves as of Persian ancestry primarily, and more consistently regard themselves as neither Arabs nor recent labor migrants from mainland Africa.

See also
 Afro-Shirazi Party
 Kilwa Sultanate
 Kizimkazi Mosque
 Shirazis of the Comoros
 Shirazi era
 Shirazi, Kenya
 Sultan al-Hasan ibn Sulaiman
 Tongoni Ruins
 Tumbatu
 Zanj Empire

Notes

References

Bibliography
 
 
 
 
 
 
 
 
 

 
Bantu peoples
Ethnic groups in Tanzania
Ethnic groups in the Comoros
Muslim communities in Africa
Swahili
Muslim ethnoreligious groups in Africa
Archaeological history of Eastern Africa